George F. Anderson may refer to:

George Frederick Anderson (1793–1876), British violinist and Master of the Queen's Music
George F. Anderson, member of the South Dakota State Senate in 1905